Jere Hribar (born 19 January 2004) is a Croatian competitive swimmer. He is the 2022 World Junior Championships silver medalist in the 100-metre freestyle and bronze medalist in the 50-metre freestyle. At the 2022 European Junior Championships, he won the silver medal in the 50-metre freestyle.

Background
Hribar was born 19 January 2004 in Croatia. In the autumn of 2022, he committed to attending Louisiana State University for college and competing for the LSU Tigers swim team beginning in the autumn of 2023.

Career

2021–2022
At the 2021 European Junior Swimming Championships, held in July in Rome, Italy, Hribar helped a achieve a seventh-place finish in the final of the 4×100-metre freestyle relay, swimming the first leg of the relay in 51.00 seconds to contribute to the final time of 3:22.64, and placed eighth in the final of the 50-metre freestyle with a time of 23.03 seconds and 21st in the preliminary heats of the 100-metre freestyle with a time of 51.22 seconds. The following year, at the 2022 European Junior Swimming Championships held in July in Otopeni, Romania, he swam a time of 50.44 seconds for the first leg of the 4×100-metre freestyle relay in the final before the second leg swimmer left early with a -0.04 reaction time and the final relay time of 3:21.63 was deemed ineligible by LEN officials and the relay results were disqualified. Day two of competition, he helped achieve an eighth-place finish and set a new Croatian record in the final of the 4×100-metre mixed freestyle relay, contributing a time of 50.27 seconds for the first leg of the relay to the final mark of 3:34.28. Two days later, he won the silver medal in the 50-metre freestyle with a time of 22.55 seconds in the final, after swimming a personal best time of 22.32 seconds in the preliminaries one day prior. In his final two events, he tied Davide Passafaro of Italy for eleventh-place in the semifinals of 100-metre freestyle with a time of 50.73 seconds on day five and was disqualified in the preliminaries of the 4×100-metre medley relay on day six.

2022 World Junior Championships

Starting his competition on day three at the 2022 FINA World Junior Swimming Championships, held in August and September in Lima, Peru, Hribar ranked second in the morning preliminary heats of the 50-metre freestyle with a time 22.42 seconds and qualified for the semifinals. For the evening semifinals, he finished in a time of 22.35 seconds and qualified for the final ranking first. In the event final the following day, he finished 0.59 seconds behind Diogo Ribeiro of Portugal and 0.04 seconds behind Nikolas Antoniou of Cyprus with a time of 22.55 seconds to win the bronze medal. For the morning preliminary heats of his second and final event, the 100-metre freestyle, the following morning, he qualified for the semifinals with a time of 50.29 seconds and overall seventh-rank. He swam a 50.12 in the evening semifinals, qualifying for the final ranking third. In the final, he won the silver medal with a personal best time of 49.37 seconds, finishing 2.24 seconds behind gold medalist David Popovici of Romania and 0.54 seconds ahead of silver medalist Nikolas Antoniou.

2022 Swimming World Cup
On the first day of the 2022 FINA Swimming World Cup in Berlin, Germany, Hribar swam a personal best time of 21.84 seconds in the preliminary heats of the 50-metre freestyle and placed 20th. Day two, he placed 30th in the preliminary heats of the 100-metre freestyle with a personal best time of 48.64 seconds, which was 2.18 seconds behind first-ranked Maxime Grousset of France. The third and final day, he achieved a third personal best time, this time in the 50-metre butterfly preliminary heats, where he placed 44th with a 24.14.

International championships (50 m)

Personal best times

Long course metres (50 m pool)

Legend: h – preliminary heat

Short course metres (25 m pool)

Legend: h – preliminary heat

National records

Long course metres (50 m pool)

Awards and honours
 Slobodna Dalmacija, Split Men's Best in Sport (Swimming): 2022

References

External links
 

2004 births
Living people
Croatian male swimmers
Croatian male freestyle swimmers
21st-century Croatian people